Hurricane Ana was the second tropical cyclone in 2014 to threaten the U.S. state of Hawaii with a direct hit, after Iselle in August. The twenty-first named storm and fifteenth hurricane of the 2014 Pacific hurricane season, Ana formed from a disturbance that formed in the Central Pacific in mid-October. It rapidly consolidated, and a tropical depression developed by October 13. Aided by favorable conditions, Ana gradually strengthened while  moving westward, threatening to pass over the island chain of Hawaii once or several times as indicated by early forecasts. By October 17, it had strengthened to a hurricane south of Hawaii and reached its peak intensity shortly afterwards while also making its closest approach. Afterwards, Ana weakened and began to fluctuate in intensity as it turned to the north and eventually northeast as it rounded a subtropical ridge and interacted with a cold front before becoming a hurricane briefly again on October 25. Ana transitioned into an extratropical cyclone on October 26, and raced across the northwest Pacific before dissipating by October 28 after it came ashore in Western Canada.

Because Ana was originally forecasted to strike the Big Island of Hawaii early in its life, tropical storm watches and eventually warnings were issued in advance of the storm. These were later expanded across nearly the whole island chain as Ana nudged more to the west than forecasted. The swath of tropical storm force winds missed the islands as well, minimizing damage by a great deal.

Meteorological history

In mid-October 2014, disorganized but deep convection persisted in the Central Pacific at low latitudes. By October 12, the Central Pacific Hurricane Center (CPHC) noted the potential for tropical cyclogenesis in the vicinity of the convection. Over the next day, rapid organization occurred as an area of low pressure formed and convection became significantly better organized. Based on this, advisories were issued on Tropical Depression Two-C at 21:00 UTC. Further organization continued within the system and the cyclone was eventually upgraded to Tropical Storm Ana by the next day.

A cold front that had been passing through the Central Pacific had begun to weaken a subtropical ridge to Ana's north, which allowed it to gain latitude as it moved west due to deep steering flow. Ana began to curve westwards, and weakening began to ensue shortly afterwards, and fell below hurricane intensity by 06:00 UTC on October 20.

Ana continued to track westwards away from the Hawaiian islands, until it reached the western periphery of the subtropical ridge and as a cold front began to extend towards it. At this point, Ana had weakened to a minimal tropical storm. As it turned northeast, warm sea surface temperatures caused Ana to rapidly reorganize and strengthen, and by 03:00 UTC on October 25, Ana became a hurricane again, with a cloud-filled eye developing aside other structural improvements. By 15:00 UTC on October 26, Ana had transitioned into an extratropical cyclone. According to the CPHC, this made Ana the longest-lived and longest-tracked tropical cyclone that stayed entirely within the Central Pacific basin. Ana's extratropical remnant continued to race northeastward across the Pacific Ocean, before making landfall in British Columbia, dissipating afterward on October 28.

Preparations and impact

Beginning on October 15, various tropical cyclone warnings and watches were issued for Hawaii, starting with a tropical storm watch for the Big Island. Three days later, a tropical storm warning was issued for Kauai and Niihau, and was extended to include portions of the Papahānaumokuākea Marine National Monument. The threat of the storm forced parks and beaches to close in the state. The rains caused the Sand Island water treatment plant in Honolulu to overflow, which sent about 5,000 gallons of partially treated wastewater into Honolulu Harbor.

Although no real-time wind reports of damage from Ana was reported on the Big Island, a post-storm report in November 2014 by resident Keith Robinson reported that there was damage in the southern vicinity of Niihau. He reported extensive vegetation damage as well as tree tops levelled at "an estimated Beaufort Wind Scale range of ". Although it was not officially verified, the CPHC decided to treat the report as part of the conditions experienced in the area that was under a tropical storm warning.

See also
Hurricane Flossie (2007)
Hurricane Darby (2016)

References

External links

 The CPHC's Tropical Cyclone Report on Ana
 The CPHC's tropical cyclone advisory archive on Ana 

Ana (2014)
Ana (2014)
2014 in Hawaii
Extratropical cyclones
2014 in Canada
2014 in British Columbia
2014 in the United States
Ana (2014)
2014 in Alaska
Ana